USS Walter S. Brown (DE-258) was an  of the United States Navy during World War II. She was engaged in protecting convoys in the North Atlantic and Mediterranean.

Namesake
Walter Scott Brown was born on 14 March 1916 at North Loup, Nebraska. He enlisted in the Navy on 9 January 1940. He was assigned to Patrol Squadron 24 based at Naval Air Station, Kaneohe Bay, Oahu, Hawaii on 9 October. He advanced to the rank of aviation machinists' mate 2d class on 1 November 1941. He was killed in action during the Japanese Attack on Pearl Harbor. He was posthumously commended by the Commander in Chief, Pacific Fleet for his bravery during the attack.

Construction and commissioning
She was laid down on 10 January 1943 at Boston, Massachusetts, by the Boston Navy Yard; launched on 22 February 1943; sponsored by Mrs. Garth Thomas; and commissioned on 25 June 1943.

World War II North Atlantic operations 
Following shakedown in Casco Bay, Maine, Walter S. Brown joined Escort Division CortDiv 5 and began escorting convoys across the Atlantic to Gibraltar and North African ports. By the spring of 1944 she had completed four such round-trip voyages. Interspersed between these voyages were periods of refresher training and availability.
 
On 20 April 1944, Walter S. Brown arrived at Hampton Roads, Virginia, to join the screen of UGS-40. Three days later, this group which included some 65 merchantmen sailed for the Mediterranean. The screen, led by  contained three elderly flush-decked, four-pipe destroyers, six American destroyer escorts from CortDiv 5, and two French destroyer escorts.

Preparations for German Air Attacks  
Due to the success of recent attacks by the German Luftwaffe against Allied convoys in the western Mediterranean, UGS-40 sailed with an elaborate air defense plan, formulated by the convoy's screen commander, Comdr. Jesse C. Sowell, in Campbell. Practiced in Hampton Roads prior to the convoy's departure and as it crossed the Atlantic, these tactics were designed to meet mass aerial attacks by German aircraft carrying a variety of weapons ranging from bombs, to torpedoes, to radio-controlled glider bombs.
 
Off Gibraltar the British anti-aircraft cruiser , the escorts  and  together with a British salvage tug and two American minesweepers carrying special apparatus to jam radar transmissions and thus confuse the German glider bombs joined the convoy.

Shadowed by German Air Observation Aircraft  
On 9 May, the convoy passed through the Strait of Gibraltar without incident but, two days later, detected German "snoopers" trailing the convoy. In the next few hours, 10 successive shore-based fighter interception sorties including some conducted by British radar-equipped Beaufighters failed to drive off the enemy reconnaissance aircraft. The Germans maintained contact with the Allied ships.
 
First alerted by shore-based radar "eyes", the escort screen went to general quarters at 1316 on 11 May, beginning the first of five successive "on again—off again" alerts. In Campbell, the commander of the screen, Jesse Clyburn Sowell, enjoined his escorts to be especially vigilant and warned that a dusk attack was well within the realm of possibility. As UGS-40 went to general quarters at 2043 that evening,  and  took stations on Walter S. Brown's flanks.
 
Eleven minutes after sunset beneath a moonless, overcast sky, Walter S. Brown received orders to commence laying smoke.

The German Aircraft Attack  
A mixed force of Ju 88s, He 111s, and Do 217s approached from the stern of the convoy and broke into groups to attack from different points of the compass. Eight minutes after the initial sightings, the first German aircraft came in low and fast and entered Walter S. Brown's defense sector. The destroyer escort trained her guns on two aircraft, but these targets quickly slipped out of range. Two more, however, then came into range. Walter S. Brown commenced fire with her forward 20-millimeter and 3-inch battery and scored hits on both aircraft. One climbed for a moment into a steep, almost vertical bank but then faltered and crashed astern of the ship.
 
Seconds later, a fifth aircraft bore in fast across the destroyer escort's bow and her starboard side and crossed over to port. Both Walter S. Brown and Dobler engaged the aircraft with their 20-millimeter and  guns resulting in its destruction. "Almost immediately", wrote Lt. Comdr. Louis B. Burdette, USNR, in his action report, "another single plane was reported coming in from ahead." Again all forward guns swung about, tracked their target, and opened fire as the aircraft swung right to attempt to launch a torpedo at the lead escorts. Despite the fact that the gunners could not hear the bearings being called out from the bridge over the sound-powered phones the fire from the Oerlikons deterred the aircraft from making an attack.

Attack by German Aircraft Defeated  
No ships were damaged in the attack. Walter S. Brown, which had engaged six enemy aircraft during the seven-minute battle, dropped astern at 2153 in company with  the British tug Hengist and the French coastal escort Cimieterre to search for possible casualties. After a thorough search in which nothing was found the ships returned to the convoy.

Commendation from the Convoy Commander  
Of UGS-40's defense, Comdr. Sowell had high praise for the men and ships of the convoy's screen and was especially complimentary in judging Walter S. Brown's performance. "It is believed", he wrote, "that her performance, when coordinated with the other forces present, broke up the enemy's attack, disrupted his plans, and resulted in no Allied losses; whereas, the enemy suffered a heavy loss of planes."

End-of-War Activities  
For the remainder of the war in Europe, Walter S. Brown continued to escort convoys on round trips from the east coast of the United States to North African ports. Then, in the summer of 1945, she operated briefly in training exercises with submarines off the northeast coast of the United States.

Final Decommissioning 
Decommissioned at the New York Naval Shipyard on 4 October 1945, Walter S. Brown was struck from the Navy List on 24 October 1945. Her scrapping by the New York Naval Shipyard was completed by 12 July 1946.

Awards  
Walter S. Brown received one battle star for her World War II service

References

External links
 

World War II frigates and destroyer escorts of the United States
Walter S. Brown (DE-258)
Ships built in Boston
1943 ships